The 5000 and 10000 metres distances for men in the 2009–10 ISU Speed Skating World Cup were contested over six races on six occasions, out of a total of seven World Cup occasions for the season, with the first occasion taking place in Berlin, Germany, on 6–8 November 2009, and the final occasion taking place in Heerenveen, Netherlands, on 12–14 March 2010.

The previous season's runner-up, Håvard Bøkko of Norway, won the cup, while Ivan Skobrev of Russia came second, and Bob de Jong of the Netherlands repeated his third place from the previous season. The defending champion, Sven Kramer of the Netherlands, finished only fourth, despite winning the first four races.

Top three

Race medallists

Final standings
Standings as of 14 March 2010 (end of the season).

References

Men 5000